Narpat Singh Rajvi (born 23 January 1952, Sikar) is a senior Bharatiya Janata Party politician from the Indian state of Rajasthan. He was born to Rajvi Amar Singh, a judge, and Rani Jas Kanwar. He is married to Ratan Kanwar, the daughter of senior Indian politician and former vice-president of India late Shree Bhairon Singh Shekhawat. They have three children: one daughter, Mumal Rajvi a lawyer by profession, and two sons, Vikramaditya Singh Rajvi who is studying currently in London and Abhimanyu Singh Rajvi, the vice president of BJP Yuva Morcha in Rajasthan, much seen as a political heir to his grandfather.

He was the minister of health in the government of Rajasthan and a MLA from Chittorgarh. In 2008 and 2013 he fought elections from vidyadhar Nagar, in the latest 2013 elections Rajvi defeated the congress candidate by a huge margin of 37,920 votes. He also wins the legislative assembly election in 2018.

References 
http://www.rajasthan.gov.in/rajgovt/keypeopleprofile/narpatsinghrajvi.html

Rajasthani politicians
Living people
1952 births
People from Sikar district
Bharatiya Janata Party politicians from Rajasthan
Rajasthan MLAs 2018–2023